The United States Army's Master Gunner Identification Badge (MGIB) recognizes soldiers who complete one of eight U.S. Army master gunner courses and is an indicator for commanders and soldiers to value the master gunner's advice regarding the training and employment of weapon systems.

According to a U.S. Army article, the master gunner is the technical and tactical experts for their weapon's platform.  They advise the commander on everything related to the vehicle platform and weapon systems.  They also develop training materials to conduct gunnery and live-fire exercises.  "I rely on my master gunners.  I probe them for information based on how best to maintain our weapons as well as train our crews... They are there every step of the way from the time we put those crews together until the time we qualify them...," said Captain Kevin Zhang of the 1st Cavalry Division (1st Cav).  "Master gunners are trained in methodology... What it boils down to is knowing the standard and being that person in the unit to enforce the standard, and to make sure that people are qualifying correctly... We're also experts in current gun maintenance so we can troubleshoot and fix a lot of problems and issues that may occur at the range, on the spot, instead of having to fall back to unit mechanics," explained Sergeant 1st Class Nathan Quarberg of 1st Cav.

The final design of the MGIB was officially approved by the United States Army Institute of Heraldry (TIOH) on 31 January 2019 but was awarded to the first graduating classes of key U.S. Army fires schools on 8 January 2018. According to the U.S. Army's NCO Journal, the MGIB was designed to recognize both the schools and different U.S. Army branch histories with gunnery:

The approved design of the MGIB comes in three versions: regular size, regular size–subdued (both at ), and a miniature version (at ).  The non-subdued version is made of polished nickel silver with a scroll at its base covered in a black textured epoxy.

The eight U.S. Army master gunner courses eligible to award the MGIB to its graduates are:
 Field Artillery Master Gunnery Course
 Master Gunnery–M1/M1A1 Abrams Course
 Infantry fighting vehicle Master Gunner Course
 Avenger Master Gunner Course
 M1A2 Abrams System Enhancement Package (SEP) Master Gunner Course
 Stryker Master Gunner Course
 Patriot Master Gunner Course
 Aviation Master Gunner Course

References

Awards and decorations of the United States Army
United States military badges